The Kassianspitze is a mountain in the Sarntal Alps in South Tyrol, Italy.

References 
 Barbara Klotzner (ed.): Kompass Wanderbuch, Bozen-Salten-Schlern-Ritten-Sarntal-Eggental. Fleischmann, Starnberg 1996, 
 Topografische Wanderkarte, Monti Sarenti / Sarntaler Alpen, Blatt 040, 1:25.000, Casa Editrice Tabacco,

External links 

Mountains of the Alps
Mountains of South Tyrol
Sarntal Alps